The Long Tom River is a  tributary of the Willamette River in western Oregon in the United States. It drains an area at the south end of the Willamette Valley between Eugene and Corvallis.

It rises in the Central Oregon Coast Range in western Lane County, approximately 10 mi (16 km) west of Veneta. It flows east through the mountains to Veneta, through the Fern Ridge Reservoir, and then north into the Willamette Valley, roughly parallel to and west of the Willamette River. It joins the Willamette from the southwest approximately 4 mi (6.5 km) west of Halsey. The Fern Ridge Reservoir was created in 1942 when the United States Army Corps of Engineers dammed the river to control flooding.

The Long Tom waters support more than 140,000 people in the area, including residents in the city of Veneta and the rural farming communities of Alvadore, Cheshire, Crow, Franklin, and Noti, as well as industrial and commercial land on the western edge of Eugene. These lands were inhabited by the Chelamela group of the Kalapuya Indians prior to European settlement.

The Oregon Country Fair is one of many groups and agencies that work with the Long Tom Watershed Council to protect and restore the river.

Name
The river's name, Long Tom, developed gradually during the 19th century in imitation of a native tribal group called Lung-tum-ler. The Native American name of this Kalapuyan group is [lámpʰtumpif], literally meaning "spank-his-ass".

Tributaries
Named tributaries from source to mouth are Micheals, Jones, Swamp, Dusky, Hayes, Sweet, Green, and Gold creeks. Then come Noti, Wilson, Indian creeks before the river enters Fern Ridge Reservoir. Hannavan and Inman creeks enter the reservoir as does Coyote Creek. (The topographic map also shows a separate Coyote Creek that leaves the reservoir south of the main Long Tom channel and rejoins it further downstream.) Below the reservoir come Squaw, the second confluence with Coyote Creek, then Lingo Slough, Bear, Amazon, Ferguson, Shafer, and Miller creeks.

See also
List of longest streams of Oregon
List of dams and reservoirs in United States
List of rivers of Oregon

References

External links
Long Tom Watershed Council; includes "virtual tour" and aerial photos

Rivers of Oregon
Rivers of Lane County, Oregon
Tributaries of the Willamette River
Oregon placenames of Native American origin